Sagrada Família is an unfinished basilica in Barcelona, Catalonia.

Sagrada Familia may also refer to:

 Holy Family

Places
 Sagrada Familia, Chile, a town
 Sagrada Família (Barcelona Metro), a station on the Barcelona Metro serving the basilica
 Sagrada Família (neighborhood), a neighborhood of Barcelona, named after the basilica

Other
 Templo de la Sagrada Familia, Cusco, a colonial Renaissance church in Cusco, Cusco Region, Peru
 , an East Timorese organisation
 La Sagrada Familia (song), a song by the Alan Parsons Project from the 1987 album Gaudi
 Alexandre da Sagrada Família (1737–1818), formerly Alexandre José da Silva, 25th Bishop of Angra

See also 
 Holy Family (disambiguation)
 La Familia (disambiguation)